An eroge ( or , erogē; ; a portmanteau of erotic game , erochikku gēmu) is a Japanese genre of erotic video game. In 1982, Japan's Koei, founded by husband-and-wife team Yoichi and Keiko Erikawa (and later known for strategy video games), released the first erotic computer game with sexually explicit graphics, Night Life, an early graphic adventure game for the NEC PC-8801. That same year, Koei released another erotic title, Danchi Tsuma no Yuwaku (Seduction of the Condominium Wife), which was an early role-playing adventure game with colour graphics, owing to the eight-color palette of the NEC PC-8001 computer. It became a hit, helping Koei become a major software company. On the other hand, some writers, like Naoki Miyamoto, considered the Yakyūken (1981) produced for Sharp MZ computers by Hudson Soft to be the first Japanese adult game.

Like with Koei, several other now-famous Japanese companies such as Enix, Square and Nihon Falcom also released erotic adult games for the PC-8801 computer in the early 1980s before they became mainstream. Early eroge usually had simplistic stories and extreme sexual content, such as rape and lolicon. In some of the early erotic games, the erotic content is meaningfully integrated into a thoughtful and mature storyline, though others often used it as simply an excuse for pornography.

In 1999, Key released Kanon. It contains about 7 brief erotic scenes in a sentimental story the size of a long novel (an all-ages version was also released afterward). Kanon sold over 300,000 copies.

In response to increasing pressure from Japanese lobby groups, in mid-1996 Sega of Japan announced that they would no longer permit Sega Saturn games to include nudity.

History

Eroge, also known as erotic games, have their origins in the early 1980s, when Japanese companies introduced their own brands of microcomputer to compete with those of the United States. Competing systems included the X1, FM-7, MSX, and PC-8801.

The earliest known commercial erotic computer game is PSK's Lolita Yakyūken, released in 1982. That same year, Koei released the erotic title, which was an early role-playing adventure game with color graphics, owing to the eight-color palette of the PC-8001 computer. It became a hit, helping Koei become a major software company.

In another opinion, Yuji Horii recalled in 1986 that he saw a demonstration of a Yakyūken-like game running on the FM-8 in the end of 1981, and he considered Yakyūken was the origin of adult games. Some writers say that Yakyūken produced for Sharp MZ computers by Hudson Soft is the first Japanese adult game.

Other now-famous Japanese companies such as Enix, Square and Nihon Falcom also released erotic adult games for the PC-8801 computer in the early 1980s before they became mainstream. Early eroge usually had simple stories, some even involving anal sex, which often led to widespread condemnation from the Japanese media. In some of the early erotic games, the erotic content is meaningfully integrated into a thoughtful and mature storytelling, though others often used it as a flimsy excuse for pornography. Erotic games made the PC-8801 popular, but customers quickly became tired of paying 8800 yen ($85) for such simple games. Soon, new genres were invented: ASCII's Chaos Angels, a role-playing-based eroge, inspired Dragon Knight by Elf and Rance by AliceSoft.

In the early 1990s eroge games became much more common. Most eroge games, a fairly large library, found its way on the PC-9801 platform. FM Towns also received many games, more so than the X68000 or MS-DOS, whilst the MSX platform (which had many eroge games in the 1980s) was nearing the end of its lifetime. Eroge was much less common on consoles – only NEC's PC Engine series had officially licensed adult games, and from the mid-90s, Sega's Saturn. Both Nintendo and Sony disallowed adult video games on their consoles. Games also started to appear on Windows as it grew in popularity.

In 1992, Elf released Dōkyūsei. In it, before any eroticism, the user has to first win the affection of one of a number of female characters, making the story into an interactive romance novel. Thus, the love simulation genre was invented. Soon afterwards, the video game Otogirisou on the Super Famicom attracted the attention of many Japanese gamers. Otogirisou was a standard adventure game but had multiple endings. This concept was called a "sound novel".

In 1996, the new software developer and publisher Leaf expanded on this idea, calling it a visual novel and releasing their first successful game, Shizuku, a horror story starring a rapist high school student, with very highly reviewed writing and music. Their next game, Kizuato, was almost as dark. However, in 1997, they released To Heart, a sweetly sentimental story of high school love that became one of the most famous and trendsetting eroge ever. To Heart music was so popular it was added to karaoke machines throughout Japan—a first for eroge.

After a similar game by Tactics, One: Kagayaku Kisetsu e, became a hit in 1998, Visual Arts scouted main creative staff of One to form a new brand under them, which became Key. In 1999, Key released Kanon. It contains only about seven brief erotic scenes in a sentimental story the size of a long novel (an all-ages version was also released afterward), but the enthusiasm of the response was unprecedented, and Kanon sold over 300,000 copies. In 2002 a 13-episode anime series was produced, as well as another 24-episode anime series in 2006. According to Satoshi Todome's A History of Eroge, Kanon is still the standard for modern eroge and is referred to as a "baptism" for young otaku in Japan. Although many eroge still market themselves primarily on sex, eroge that focus on story are now a major established part of Japanese otaku culture. Oftentimes, voice actors who have voiced for eroge have been credited under a pseudonym.

As the visual novel standard was adopted, the erotic parts in eroge began to become less and less apparent. Many eroge become more story-oriented than sex-oriented, making story the main focus for many modern eroge. More and more people who used to reject such type of games began to become more open-minded, realizing that eroge are not just about sex anymore. A lot of story-focused eroge tend to have only a few erotic scenes.

Another subgenre is called , in which sexual gratification of the player is the main focus of the game.

Gameplay

There is no set definition for the gameplay of eroge, except that they all include explicit erotic or sexual content depending on the game. Like other pornographic media in Japan, erotic scenes feature censorship of genitalia, only becoming uncensored if the game is licensed and released outside Japan, unless produced illegally by dōjin (usually with a construction kit like NScripter or RPG Maker). Additionally, some games may receive an "all-ages" version, such as a port to consoles or handheld devices where pornographic content isn't allowed, which either remove or censor the sex scenes entirely.

Eroge is most often a visual novel or dating sim. However, there are also many other gameplay genres represented within eroge, such as role-playing games, mahjong games, or puzzle games. Some eroge, such as those made by Illusion Soft, are just simulations of sex, with no "conventional" gameplay included.

See also
 Bishōjo game
 Hentai § Origin of erotic games
 List of eroge
 Sex and nudity in video games
 Visual novel

References

Further reading

External links

 A History of Eroge (archived from the original)
 The Bluffer's Guide to Hentai Games (Eurogamer)
 RPG Eroge (Anime Hentai Hub)

 
Video game genres